Il signor Bruschino, ossia Il figlio per azzardo (Signor Bruschino, or The Accidental Son) is a one act operatic farce (farsa giocosa per musica) by Gioachino Rossini to a libretto by Giuseppe Maria Foppa, based upon the 1809 play Le fils par hasard, ou ruse et folie by René de Chazet and Maurice Ourry. The opera was first performed in Venice at the Teatro San Moisè on 27 January 1813.

Between 1810 and 1813, the young Rossini composed five pieces for the Teatro San Moisè, beginning with La cambiale di matrimonio (Bill of Exchange of Marriage), his first opera, and ending with Il signor Bruschino. These farse were short pieces, popular in Venice at the end of the 18th century and the beginning of the 19th century. They were intimate, with a cast of five to eight singers, always including a pair of lovers, here Sofia and Florville, at least two comic parts, here Bruschino senior, Gaudenzio and Filiberto, and one or more minor roles, here Marianna, Bruschino junior and a policeman.  The style called for much visual comedy improvised by the players, and often a compulsive linguistic ‘tic’.  Here, Bruschino senior often repeats the phrase "Oh, it’s so hot!". As compared with many genres of opera, acting and comedic talent is more important relative to the required singing ability. Rossini's farces also have a significant sentimental element. Overall, it has been described as "a vivacious and fast-moving musical comedy, whose graceful score reveals traces still of Cimarosa and even Mozart."

Il signor Bruschino is forward-looking in its use of new musical effects.  For example, in the overture, the second violins are instructed to tap their bows on their music stands. This lighthearted, energetic overture is one of several by Rossini to have gained considerable importance in the modern concert repertoire.

Performance history
The opera was not given in North America nor in Britain until the 20th century. Its New York premiere took place on 9 December 1932 at the Metropolitan Opera and it was first seen on 14 July 1960 in England, presented by the Kent Opera Group, an amateur company.  Other performances have taken place in Italy and elsewhere in Europe, in particular, stagings in Paris and Macerata in 1992.

Roles

Synopsis
Time: 18th Century
Place: Gaudenzio's castle in France.

Sofia and Florville are in love, but Sofia's guardian, Gaudenzio, opposes the match.  Florville's father and Gaudenzio are old enemies.  Florville's father dies, removing one barrier, but Gaudenzio has already agreed to wed Sofia to the son of his old friend, Signor Bruschino senior. Sofia has never met her fiancé, Bruschino junior, as they were betrothed by correspondence. On his way to meet Sofia, young Bruschino stops at a tavern, runs up an impressive bill and is detained when he is unable to pay.  Seizing the opportunity, Florville pretends to be Bruschino junior so that he can marry Sofia.  Complications arise when Bruschino senior arrives at Gaudenzio's house.  Fortunately, however, he is eventually forced to accept Florville as his own son.  In a playful trio, Florville (as Bruschino junior) begs his "father" for forgiveness, while Gaudenzio upbraids old Bruschino for his lack of fatherly sympathy.

Musical numbers

Sinfonia
"Deh! tu m'assisti amore" 
Duettino - "Marianna!... Voi signore?" 
"Quanto e dolce a un'alma amnate" 
"A voi lieto ritorno, cara Sofia" 
"Ah se il colpo arrivo a fare" 
"A noi su, trasformiamoci" 
"Nel teatro del gran mondo"
"Lasciatemi... che violenza!..." 

"Per un figlio gia pentito" 
"Impaziente son io di Saper" 
"Ah, voi condur volete... Ah, donate il caro sposo" 
"Qui convien finirla" 
"Ho la testa, o e andata via?" 
"Va tutto ben" 
"E bel nodo, che due cori" 
"Ebben, ragion, dovere"
"E tornato Filiberto"

Recordings

References
Notes

Sources
Gossett, Philip; Brauner, Patricia (2001), "Il signor Bruschino" in Holden, Amanda (ed.), The New Penguin Opera Guide, New York: Penguin Putnam. 
Osborne, Charles (1994), The Bel Canto Operas of Rossini, Donizetti, and Bellini, London: Methuen; Portland, Oregon: Amadeus Press.  
Osborne, Richard (1998), "Il signor Bruschino", in Stanley Sadie  (Ed.),  The New Grove Dictionary of Opera, Vol. xxxx.  London: Macmillan Publishers, Inc.

External links
Carlo Piazza,  Il signor Bruschino from the Festival di Torrechiara, 2001, commentary, retrieved 26 February 2010
Center for Italian Opera Studies at The University of Chicago critical edition outline, retrieved 26 February 2010
Libretto, retrieved 14 November 2012

Operas by Gioachino Rossini
Italian-language operas
One-act operas
Farse
1813 operas
Operas
Operas set in France
Operas based on plays